József Ács (born 1931) is a Hungarian sculptor and medalist. Ács studied at the Hungarian Academy of Fine Arts from 1952 to 1958. His work is primarily sculpture, but he also deals with the design of portrait busts and medals. In 1965 he was commissioned to produce a bronze bust of Alexander Graham Bell in Budapest. In 1968, he made a solo exhibition at the Cultural Center ("Művelődési Ház") of the Budapest neighborhood of Rákosligeti.

Gallery

References

Hungarian sculptors
1931 births
Living people
Place of birth missing (living people)